Matthew John Dolan (born January 12, 1965) is an American attorney and politician who has served as a member of the Ohio Senate from the 24th district since 2017. He previously served as a member of the Ohio House of Representatives from 2005 to 2010.

Dolan's father Larry bought the Cleveland Guardians (then Cleveland Indians) in 2000 and gave Matt a partial stake in the Major League Baseball team. Prior to his election victory in 2016, Dolan was part of the team's front office, overseeing the budget and also running the team's charity program.

On September 20, 2021, he announced his candidacy in the 2022 United States Senate election in Ohio. He lost the Republican primary, coming in third.  On January 17, 2023, he announced his candidacy in the 2024 United States Senate election in Ohio.

Early life and career
Dolan was born and raised in Chardon, Ohio, and is a graduate of Gilmour Academy. He earned a Bachelor of Arts degree in history from Boston College and a Juris Doctor from the Case Western Reserve University School of Law. Forbes ranked the extended Dolan family as the 54th richest in the United States in 2015, with most of its wealth attributed to his uncle Charles' investments in cable television.

An attorney, Dolan is a former chief assistant prosecutor for Geauga County and assistant attorney general for the State of Ohio. He is a partner at the law firm of Thrasher, Dinsmore & Dolan.
Matt's cousin James Dolan is the owner of New York Knicks of the NBA.

Politics

Ohio House of Representatives 
In 2004, Dolan was elected to represent the 98th District in the Ohio House of Representatives, and was re-elected in 2006 and 2008. He resigned in January 2010 to focus on a run for Cuyahoga County  Executive. On November 2, 2010, he lost to Lakewood Mayor Ed FitzGerald.

Ohio Senate 
After taking a break from politics to work in the Indians' front office, in 2016, Dolan opted to make a comeback by running to succeed state Senator Tom Patton, who was term-limited that year after serving in the Senate for over eight years. A competitive seat on paper, the 24th District had been held by Republicans for over thirty years, which created a competitive primary. For the Republican nomination, Dolan faced sitting state Representatives Nan Baker and Mike Dovilla. However, his name recognition and large personal wealth put him over the edge, and he won the nomination with 44% of the vote, to Baker's 29% and Dovilla's 27%.

While the general election was at first deemed competitive, it did not prove to be in the end. Facing Emily Hagan, an assistant county prosecutor and the niece of former Cuyahoga County commissioner and gubernatorial candidate Tim Hagan, Dolan won with over 58% of the vote. He was sworn into office on January 3, 2017. In 2020, Dolan was reelected with 54% of the vote, beating Democrat Tom Jackson.

2022 U.S. Senate bid 
On September 20, 2021, Dolan declared his bid in the 2022 United States Senate election in Ohio. He ran as a traditional Republican that Ohio Republicans have tended to elect in statewide elections including Rob Portman, George Voinovich, and Mike DeWine. Dolan was the only candidate that did not put his full support behind Donald Trump during the campaign, but he was sure to explain that he voted for Trump in 2016 and 2020. On March 21, 2022, during a debate between the Republican candidates running for Senate in 2022, Dolan was the only candidate to raise his hand when they were asked if Trump should "stop talking about the 2020 election". Despite Dolan's poll numbers surging during the last days of the primary campaign, Dolan ultimately lost the primary. He came in third (behind J. D. Vance and Josh Mandel) with 23.3% of the vote, carrying only three counties: Cuyahoga (his home county), Geauga, and Franklin.

2024 U.S Senate bid
On January 17, 2023, Dolan announced his bid for the 2024 United States Senate election in Ohio, challenging incumbent Sherrod Brown. Dolan has said that his reasoning for announcing his campaign early is to get more name recognition.

References

External links
Official campaign site

1965 births
21st-century American politicians
Morrissey College of Arts & Sciences alumni
Businesspeople from Cleveland
Candidates in the 2022 United States Senate elections
Case Western Reserve University alumni
Dolan family
Lawyers from Cleveland
Living people
Ohio lawyers
People from Chagrin Falls, Ohio
People from Geauga County, Ohio
Republican Party members of the Ohio House of Representatives
Republican Party Ohio state senators
Politicians from Cleveland
Candidates in the 2024 United States Senate elections